The Gog Group is a stratigraphic unit in the Western Canada Sedimentary Basin. It is present in the western main ranges of the Canadian Rockies in Alberta and British Columbia, and in the Cariboo Mountains and in the central Purcell Mountains in southwestern British Columbia. It was named by C.F. Deiss in 1940 for a type locality near Mount Assiniboine.

Lithology and environment of deposition
The Gog Group consists primarily of thick deposits of cross-bedded quartzose sandstone and quartzite, with minor quartzitic conglomerate and sub-arkosic sandstone. It also includes mudstone, siltstone, limestone and dolomite formations. The Gog sediments are thought to have been deposited in shallow marine environments on the subsiding margin of the North American craton (Laurentia).

Stratigraphy

Subdivisions
The Gog Group is subdivided into the following formations:

Jasper area (north)

Kicking Horse Pass area (south)

Paleontology
Trace fossils such as Skolithos, Cruziana, Diplocraterion, Chondrites, Planolites, Rusophycus and others are abundant in the Gog Group sediments, and Early Cambrian trilobites of the genus Olenellus are found in the Peyto Formation limestones at the top of the Group. Small archaeocyathid bioherms have been reported from the base of the Mahato Formation, and archaeocyathids, salterellids, primitive brachiopods and echinoderms have been reported from the Mural Formation.

See also

 List of fossiliferous stratigraphic units in Alberta
 Big Rock (glacial erratic)
 Foothills Erratics Train

References

Geologic groups of North America
Geologic formations of Canada
Western Canadian Sedimentary Basin
Cambrian Alberta
Stratigraphy of Alberta
Cambrian British Columbia
Stratigraphy of British Columbia